ASEC or asec may refer to:

Science and technology
 Absolute size-exclusion chromatography
 asec (function), an inverse trigonometric function
 asec (angle unit), a unit of angle
 .asec (file extension), an Android secure encrypted file

Organisations
 ASEC Mimosas, a football club
 ASEC Ndiambour, a football club
 Alberta Students' Executive Council, an organization of post-secondary student leaders in Alberta, Canada
 Action Sports Environmental Coalition, a nonprofit organization co-founded by Bob Burnquist

See also
 Arcsec (disambiguation)